Yasaka-ji (八坂寺) is a Buddhist temple in Matsuyama, Ehime Prefecture, Japan. It is Temple 10 of the Thirteen Buddhist Sites of Iyo. It is traditionally believed to have been founded in 701.

See also 
Thirteen Buddhist Sites of Iyo

References

Buddhist temples in Ehime Prefecture
En no Gyōja